Khademlu (also Romanized as Khādemlū) is a village in Yurchi-ye Sharqi Rural District, Kuraim District, Nir County, Ardabil Province, Iran. At the 2006 census, its population was 143, in 22 families.

References 

Tageo

Towns and villages in Nir County